Resonator is a 2006 album by Tony Levin. The album is significantly different from Levin's previous solo efforts mainly due to the introduction of lead vocals on most of the tracks as well as an overall more rock-oriented sound.

The song "Utopia" originally appeared on an earlier Levin album Waters of Eden as an instrumental piece. The new version adds vocals and a guitar solo by Toto guitarist Steve Lukather. "Throw the God a Bone" features a guest performance by King Crimson singer/guitarist Adrian Belew. This was the first (and only as of November 2009) studio recording made to feature both Levin and Belew since the 1995 THRAK sessions.

Track listing
"Break It Down" – 7:02  	
"Places to Go" – 5:47 	
"Throw the God a Bone" – 5:25 	
"Utopia" – 6:21 	
"Beyond My Reach" – 5:16 	
"Shadowland" – 4:58 	
"Crisis of Faith" – 2:10 	
"What Would Jimi Do?" – 4:34 	
"Sabre Dance" – 5:07 (Aram Khachaturian)
"Fragile as a Song – 4:31

Personnel
Tony Levin – lead vocals, cello, piano, keyboards, bass guitar, Chapman stick
Jerry Marotta – drums, background vocals
Pete Levin – piano, organ
Larry Fast – synthesizers
Jesse Gress – guitar, background vocals
Adrian Belew – lead guitar on "Throw The God A Bone"
Steve Lukather – lead guitar on "Utopia"

External links
Resonator on Tony Levin's website

Tony Levin albums
2006 albums
Narada Productions albums